CL Draconis is a single star in the northern circumpolar constellation of Draco. It can be viewed with the naked eye, having an apparent visual magnitude of 4.96. It is moving closer to the Earth with a heliocentric radial velocity of −11 km/s. The star has a relatively high proper motion, traversing the celestial sphere at the rate of /yr.

Based upon a stellar classification of F0 IV, this is an aging F-type subgiant star that has consumed the hydrogen at its core. It is spinning rapidly with a projected rotational velocity of 165 km/s, giving it an oblate shape with an equatorial bulge that is estimated to be 8% larger than the polar radius. CL Dra has 1.68 times the mass of the Sun and is radiating 10.2 times the Sun's luminosity from its photosphere at an effective temperature of 7,439 K.

References

F-type subgiants
Delta Scuti variables
Draco (constellation)
Durchmusterung objects
143466
078180
5960
Draconis, CL